Beebe Ranch is an American horse ranch and museum located at 3062 Ridge Road, Chincoteague, Virginia. It closed in 2010 and then reopened on July 27, 2016. The museum focuses on two Chincoteague Ponies, Misty and her foal Stormy, featured in the novels Misty of Chincoteague (1947) and Stormy, Misty's Foal (1963) by Marguerite Henry.  Misty and Stormy resided at the ranch and their taxidermically preserved figures were displayed at the museum for many years before being relocated to the Museum of Chincoteague Island.  Misty had stayed in the house at the ranch during the Ash Wednesday Storm of 1962, a major winter storm that struck the coast and became the basis for the book Stormy, Misty's Foal.

See also

List of historical horses
List of museums in Virginia

References

External links
 Beebe Ranch on Facebook
 Database (undated).  "Beebe Ranch".  Chincoteague Chamber of Commerce.  Retrieved November 17, 2011.

2001 establishments in Virginia
Chincoteague, Virginia
Equestrian museums in the United States
History museums in Virginia
Museums established in 2001
Museums in Accomack County, Virginia
Museums disestablished in 2010
2010 disestablishments in Virginia
Museums established in 2016
2016 establishments in Virginia